Massimo Roccoli (born 27 November 1984) is an Italian motorbike rider. He competes in the CIV Supersport 600 Championship aboard a Yamaha YZF-R6. He was the CIV Supersport champion in 2006, 2007, 2008, 2015, 2016 and 2018.

Career statistics

Supersport World Championship

Races by year
(key) (Races in bold indicate pole position; races in italics indicate fastest lap)

Superbike World Championship

Races by year
(key) (Races in bold indicate pole position; races in italics indicate fastest lap)

Grand Prix motorcycle racing

Races by year
(key) (Races in bold indicate pole position; races in italics indicate fastest lap)

References

External links 

1984 births
Sportspeople from Rimini
Italian motorcycle racers
Living people
Moto2 World Championship riders
Superbike World Championship riders
Supersport World Championship riders
FIM Superstock 1000 Cup riders
MotoE World Cup riders